Chan Kowk-wai was born on April 3, 1936, at Toisaan in the province of Canton, China. He introduced traditional Shaolin Kung Fu to Brazil through the China-Brazil Kung Fu Academy. His disciples have spread as far as the USA, Canada, Spain, Argentina and the Czech Republic.

In September, 2004, Chan was awarded the 10th degree of the World Organization of Wu Shu & Kung Fu Masters from Vancouver, BC, Canada, in five styles: Northern Shaolin, Yang Taiji, Bagua, Xingyi and Hungsing Choileifat.

Kung Fu Styles 

Chan teaches a broad curriculum of old-school kung fu styles. Most of them are external styles (外家, Wàijiā):

 Northern Shaolin Boxing School, the core martial arts system from the Buddhist Shaolin Monastery of Henan, in Northern China.
 Deep Legs, originated from the Islamic Hui people; 12 Roads version.
 Fist of (Masters) Choi, Lei & Buddha, styles Exalted Victory and Northern Victory.
 Seven Stars Praying Mantis Fist, where Seven Stars refers to the northern asterism called the Big Dipper.
 Tumbling Eagle Claw.
 Fist of the Arhat, from the Buddhist concept of Arhat ("worthy of Nirvana" in Sanskrit).
 Fist of (Master) Cha, originated from the Islamic Hui people.
 Fist of the Six Harmonies, a Shaolin style based on the concept of the Six Harmonies.

The internal styles (内家, Nèijiā) taught by Chan are such:

 Yang Clan Fist of the Supreme Extremes, from the Taoist concept of the Taiji or Yin and Yang.
 Fist of the Eight Extremities, from the Chinese concept of Baji, everything within the eight ends (directions or corners) of the world, the Infinity; originated from the Islamic Hui people.
 Palm of the Eight Trigrams, from the Taoist concept of Bagua, the 8 combinations of three proportions of Yin and Yang.
 Fist of Form and Intent.
 Natural School.

Kung Fu Heritage

Chan initiated his kung fu by the age of four with Chan Cheoksing, who taught him Choileifat until he was 14. In 1949, with the constitution of the People's Republic of China, the young Chan moved with his family to Hong Kong, where he trained Shaolin Luohan with his uncle Ma Gimfung. When Yim Seungmou too left the PRC, he stayed in Hong Kong with Chan's family and taught him Gu Yujeung's Northern Shaolin Style, along with many other systems: Gu's martial qigong, healing massage techniques, Taijiquan, Xingyiquan, Bajiquan and Tantui; and Baksing Choileifat, which Yim learned directly from its founder Taam Saam (譚三), a friend of Gu. Yim Seungmou also introduced the young Chan to teachers of other styles: Wong Honfan of Seven Stars Mantis; Jeung Jimman of Eagle Claw; Wan Laisheng of Ziranmen and Liuhequan; Fu Wingfai, son of Fu Jansung, of Baguazhang; and Doctor Yan Yiuchiu of Hungsing Choileifat, with whom he learned everything he could for roughly ten years. Aforementioned masters Gu Yujeung, Fu Jansung and Wan Laisheng, alongside Li Xianwu and Wan's cousin Wan Laiping, were sent from Nanjing to teach northern styles to the South, specifically Guangzhou (Canton), around 1929, where their prowess's reputation earned them the nickname "Five Northern Tigers".

In 1960, Chan moved to Brazil, where he co-founded the Chinese Social Center (Portuguese: Centro Social Chinês) through which he taught kung fu classes for twelve years. He also taught classes at the renowned Universidade de São Paulo (USP) for seven years. In 1973, Chan founded the China-Brazil Kung Fu Academy for which he is largely known today.

The heritage tree given below details the main characters of all kung fu styles taught by Chan. Many of these characters are renowned; see section "See Also".

Personal Approach

Chan teaches the core Northern Shaolin hand sets in a different order than Gu Yujeung. The core ten sets are preceded by an introductory set and 12 Roads Tantui, as inherited by the Central Guoshu Institute. His methodology is propagated throughout the whole Sinobrasileira family.

Romanized names below are given Pinyin (Mandarin) first, then Jyupting (Cantonese).

Introductory set:
 練步拳 [Liànbùquán / Linboukyun] Training of Stances and Fists

The Five Lesser sets:
 短打 [Duǎndǎ / Dyundaa] Short Strikes (Gu's 6th)
 梅花 [Méihuā / Muifaa] Plum Blossom (Gu's 7th)
 穿心 [Chuānxīn / Cyunsam] Pierce the Heart (Gu's 4th)
 武藝 [Wǔyì / Moungai] Martial Skill (Gu's 5th)
 拔步 [Bábù / Batbou] Pull the Step (Gu's 8th)

The Five Greater sets:
 坐馬 [Zuòmǎ / Zomaa] Mount the Horse (Gu's 3rd)
 領路 [Lǐnglù / Linglou] Lead the Way (Gu's 2nd)
 開門 [Kāimén / Hoimun] Open the Gate (Gu's 1st)
 連環 [Liánhuán / Linwaan] Chain of Rings (Gu's 9th)
 式法 [Shìfǎ / Sikfaat] The Formula (Gu's 10th)

Trivia 

On April 11, 2005, the city of São Paulo paid homage to several pioneers of martial arts teaching in Brazil, including Chan, and instituted that date as the city's official Kung Fu Day. Although the date choice refers to the foundation of the São Paulo Kung Fu Federation in 1989, incidentally it also coincides with the date of Chan's first arrival in Brazil in 1960.

See also

 Bodhidharma
 Central Guoshu Institute
 Chan Heung
 Chen Changxing
 Chen Wangting
 Cheng Tinghua
 Chinese Revolution (1949)
 Chin Woo Athletic Association
 Dai Longbang
 Daoji
 Dong Haichuan
 Guo Yunshen
 Jeong Yim
 Ji Jike
 Li Jinglin
 Li Luoneng
 List of Chinese martial arts
 Ma Liang (general)
 Sung Wei-I
 Sun Lu-t'ang
 Wang Zongyue
 Yang Chien-hou
 Yang Luchan
 Yang Pan-hou
 Yue Fei
 Zhang Sanfeng

References

External links
 Academia Sino-Brasileira de Kung Fu (Brazil)
 Académie Sino Canadienne de Kung Fu (Canada)
 Asociación Kai Men Kung Fu (Argentina)
 Česko-Čínská Akademie Kungfu (Czech Republic)

1934 births
Living people
Chinese martial artists
Sportspeople from Guangdong
People from Taishan, Guangdong